This is a list of characters for the 41st Super Sentai series, Uchu Sentai Kyuranger. Much of the series takes inspiration from Greco-Roman mythology while the antagonist faction, Jark Matter, take cues from the shogunates of Japan's Edo period, the tyrants of Ancient Greece, and paranormal terminologies.

Main characters

Kyurangers

After the Orion is destroyed however, they obtain a second, stronger ship called the Battle Orion Ship.

Once the Kyurangers have been declared enemies of Jark Matter, the latter's Shogunate establish a bounty of 10.000.000  for each member. Due to the excess number of team members, the Kyurangers have to conserve the Kyutamas' energy by only allowing a limited number to be deployed on missions, with the team being randomly chosen using a bingo tumbler-like device called the  while the others remain on standby if needed.

Once all nine of the original Kyurangers are assembled, the team launches their counterattack on Jark Matter by liberating Earth from their control. They later add three more members, one being their commander and the other two from Earth. After obtaining the Tokei Kyutama, the team splits into two factions; with one staying in the present to rescue one of their companions while the other travels to the past to learn more about Jark Matter's leader, Don Armage. Upon their reunion, the Kyurangers depart from Earth to confront Don Armage on Planet Southern Cross in the Crux System to stop his Planedium Bomb from destroying the entire universe before returning to Earth to confront and defeat Don Armage once and for all.

Lucky
Because of his interpersonal skills and faith in others, he becomes a key member of the Kyurangers, helping recruit new members and resolve their personal troubles on several occasions. The former trait eventually resulted in Lucky becoming his homeworld's king after discovering his father Aslan was supposed to have been murdered by Jark Matter's Fuku Shogun Kukuruga years prior, but was instead brainwashed into one of Don Armage's thralls. With the help of his fellow Kyurangers, Lucky is able to free his father from Don Armage's control before defeating the latter and resuming his intergalactic travels with Garu by his side.

He can also use the Seiza Blaster to perform the  finisher. Unlike the other Kyurangers, Lucky's suit has no unique features.

Stinger
Following his brother, Scorpio, betraying their home planet for Jark Matter, Stinger spent the rest of his life searching for him until he was scouted by Shou Ronpo to become the first contemporary Kyuranger, . Ever since, he spied on Jark Matter for the Rebellion until he blew his cover on Earth to save Kotaro and Jiro. During the intervening years, Stinger witnessed the murder of Doctor Anton's good-half, for which Champ accused him before he cleared up the misunderstanding and going on to become his partner. Amidst his final battle with Scorpio, Stinger injected himself with own venom to use their people's  technique to boost his strength, even in spite of the life-threatening cost before his brother extracted it from him and redeemed himself by giving his life to save the Kyurangers. Following Don Armage's defeat, Stinger is promoted to the rank of the Kyurangers' new commander.

He can also use the Seiza Blaster to perform the  finisher. Stinger's suit differs from the others in that he retains his tail, which he can utilize as a weapon.

Garu
 is a lupine alien with Hiroshima dialect from the  who lost his pride, homeworld, and entire clan to Jark Matter. Ever since, he lived on the Jark Matter refugee world, until Lucky helped him recover from his trauma and fight for himself. While not the brightest or most patient Kyuranger, Garu is always reliable in battle and goes on to become Lucky's most trusted partner. After Don Armage is defeated, Garu travels with Lucky through space.

He can also use the Seiza Blaster to perform the  finisher. While exposed to moonlight-like energy from Shishi Red Moon, he gains a boost in power and intelligence that grants him a swift and elegant fighting style. Garu's suit differs from the others in that it has claws and wolf fur.

Balance
After Don Armage's defeat, Balance and Naga reformed the BN Thieves and dedicated themselves to salvaging Jark Matter's stolen treasures.

He can also use the Seiza Blaster to perform the  finisher. While exposed to sunlight-like energy from Taiyou Shishi Red, he gains a boost in speed and agility that grants him a rapid-fire fighting style. Balance's suit differs from the others in that it resembles mechanical armor rather than spandex.

Champ
Despite his reputation as a ladies' man, he displays incredible loyalty to his friends. Following this, he spent the next nine years as a professional wrestler and became a champion until Anton was assassinated by Scorpio. Champ joined the Rebellion to find his creator's killer, who he believed was Stinger until he learned the truth. After traveling back in time to learn more about Don Armage, Champ stayed behind in the past with Shou Ronpo to ensure the Kyurangers' formation and put his commander in cryogenic stasis. He eventually rejoins his allies in the present, but Anton's evil-half uses a mind control chip in Champ's circuitry to reinstate his original programming before Stinger saved him. After Don Armage is defeated, Champ returns to the robot wrestling circuit, regaining his championship belt and going on to have a 99-win streak.

He can also use the Seiza Blaster to perform the  finisher. Champ's suit differs from the others in that it is bulkier and more mechanical in appearance while his visor extends past his helmet to resemble bull horns.

Naga Ray
Although his race had long ago sealed their emotions as a result of a catastrophic war on their home planet, his peculiar interest in emotions led to an encounter with Balance and they became bounty hunters. After they met the Kyurangers, Naga quickly befriends them in the hopes of learning more about emotions as well as the difference between good and evil. Amidst their battles against Jark Matter however, Naga becomes troubled by his lack of emotions, leading to him being brainwashed by Don Armage's Fuku Shogun Akyanba into becoming  and joining Jark Matter until his allies eventually manage to save him. After Don Armage's defeat, Naga and Balance reform the BN Thieves and dedicate themselves to retrieving Jark Matter's stolen treasures.

He can also use the Seiza Blaster to perform the  finisher. Naga's suit differs from the others in that it has a scale pattern, resembling that of a snake.

After the Kyurangers freed Naga from his brainwashing, he gained a purified version of this form.

Hammie
As a child, she was an introvert who gained the courage to speak after alerting her villagers of Jark Matter's invasion. Over time, and following an encounter with a young Hoshi Minato that set her on the path to finding her dream to live on, she became an outspoken woman and member of the Rebellion. After Don Armage is defeated, Hammie attends a university to become a school teacher.

During the events of Uchu Sentai Kyuranger vs. Space Squad, Space Ninja Demost captures Hammie's mentor Tsurukiku and forces her to steal the Space Federation's Neo Kyutama so he can take over Earth. While her allies were initially conflicted over her loyalties, they eventually discovered the truth and helped Hammie save her mentor and defeat Demost.

She can also use the Seiza Blaster to perform the  finisher. Hammie's suit differs from the others in that her helmet resembles a chameleon's head, with the two bulbous mounds resembling eyes and the mouth forming the helmet's visor.

Raptor 283
As she is based on non-combat android designs developed by Tsurugi, she initially served as Shou's secretary and the Orions chief pilot. Despite this, she is also a daydreamer prone to delusions. After recognizing this, Lucky encourages Raptor to make her dream of becoming a Kyuranger a reality, allowing her to acquire the Washi Kyutama and become .

She can also use the Seiza Blaster to perform the  finisher. Raptor's suit differs from the others in that it has a pair of eagle wings that allow her to fly.

Raptor 283 is voiced by M·A·O.

Spada
 is a humanoid alien from the  who aims to become the best cook in the universe. Often serving as a parent figure to his teammates, he is reliable albeit not always sincere. He likes to make food or cooking-related metaphors based on Italian and Greek cuisines and the Italian language. His dream to become a chef stems from his poor background after his planet was invaded by Jark Matter, which resulted in a food shortage and him taking care of his starving siblings. After Don Armage is defeated, Spada fulfills his dream of opening a restaurant.

He can also use the Seiza Blaster to perform the  finisher. Spada's suit differs from the others in that his visor protrudes significantly, resembling a swordfish's nose, and can be utilized as a weapon.

Shou Ronpo
He tries to come off as imposing, but ends up behaving more like a mischievous old man. In reality, he is a guilt-ridden individual after losing his predecessor and friend, Big Bear who discourages insubordination within the Kyurangers' ranks for fear of repeating his mistake. Despite this, he is capable of maintaining his composure even in the direst situations. Before forming the Kyurangers, Shou journeyed across various constellations to acquire the Skill Kyutamas, using the Ryu Skill Kyutama to become . Encouraged by the other Kyurangers to come to terms with Big Bear's death, he upgrades his Kyutama into a Change Kyutama and gains the ability to transform into . After traveling back in time to learn more about Don Armage, Shou remained in the past with Champ to ensure the Kyurangers assemble in the future before being put into cryogenic stasis inside the Battle Orion Ship, where his team finds him in the present. Following Don Armage's defeat, Shou becomes the supreme commander of the Rebellion and appoints Stinger as his successor.

While transformed, he can use the Ryutsueider in Rifle Mode to perform the  finisher.

Kotaro Sakuma
 is a young boy from Earth who lost his mother  to illness and took care of his younger brother Jiro on his own ever since. He first met the Kyurangers after he and Jiro were captured by Eriedrone and rescued by Stinger. Inspired by this, Kotaro decides to join the Rebellion, later gaining his own Change Kyutama from the spirit of Shou's predecessor, Big Bear, and gaining the ability to transform into .

He later gains the use of a Kyu Spear, which allows him to perform the  finisher. He can also use the Seiza Blaster to perform the  finisher. Kotaro's suit differs from the others in that it is adorned with a pair of mittens that hide bear-like claws for increased offensive capabilities and his helmet has bear ear-like protrusions.

Tsurugi Ohtori
 is the former head scientist of the Tsurugi Ohtori Science Laboratory from Earth three centuries prior to the series. When Jark Matter was founded to destroy what he established, Tsurugi founded the Rebellion and the original Kyurangers, which he led alongside Orion. However, they faced heavy losses, forcing Tsurugi to sacrifice his immortality in an attempt to destroy Don Armage. When this failed, Orion placed Tsurugi in suspended animation within the spaceship Argo, split its Kyutama into the Ho, Ryukotsu and Tomo Kyutamas, and scattered them across the universe. In the present day, the Kyurangers reform the Argo Kyutama and revive Tsurugi, who discovers Jark Matter erased all records of his past achievements and the original Kyurangers from history before joining them in the fight against Don Armage. During the final battle, he ends up being possessed by Don Armage and forced to absorb Shou Ronpo. However, Lucky rescues them, leaving Don Armage hostless and vulnerable to the Kyurangers' combined powers. After Jark Matter's defeat, Tsurugi reassumes his position as president of the Space Federation.

Unlike the other Kyurangers, Tsurugi utilizes the  sidearm in order to transform into the red/navy blue-colored , . While transformed, he can use the Houou Blade & Houou Shield to perform the  finisher. Tsurugi's suit differs from the others in that it is made of a leather-like fabric, has a collar that resembles the Kyutamas' base, and his helmet is adorned with a monaural headset.

Kyutamas
The  are magical stones that give the Kyurangers their powers. Each of them are numbered and contain a power associated with a different constellation. They are stored in the Kyurangers'  during battle. By setting a Kyutama into their Kyu The Weapon, a Kyuranger can perform a variation of its finisher.

Change
The  Kyutamas allow the Kyurangers to transform and pilot their Kyu Voyagers.
 01. : Lucky's personal Leo-based Change Kyutama which allows him to transform into Shishi Red and pilot the Shishi Voyager.
 02. : Stinger's personal Scorpius-based Change Kyutama which allows him to transform into Sasori Orange and pilot the Sasori Voyager.
 03. : Garu's personal Lupus-based Change Kyutama which allows him to transform into Ookami Blue and pilot the Ookami Voyager.
 04. : Balance's personal Libra-based Change Kyutama which allows him to transform into Tenbin Gold and pilot the Tenbin Voyager.
 05. : Champ's personal Taurus-based Change Kyutama which allows him to transform into Oushi Black and pilot the Oushi Voyager.
 06. : Naga's personal Ophiuchus-based Change Kyutama which allows him to transform into Hebitsukai Silver and pilot the Hebitsukai Voyager. In Dark Naga's hands, it becomes the  Kyutama, which allows him to transform into Hebitsukai Metal. Its digit is replaced with a Jark Matter emblem.
 07. : Hammie's personal Chamaeleon-based Change Kyutama which allows her to transform into Chameleon Green and pilot the Chameleon Voyager.
 08. : Raptor's personal Aquila-based Change Kyutama which allows her to transform into Washi Pink and pilot the Washi Voyager.
 09. : Spada's personal Dorado-based Change Kyutama which allows him to transform into Kajiki Yellow and pilot the Kajiki Voyager.
 10. : Shou's personal Draco-based Change Kyutama which allows him to transform into Ryu Commander and pilot the Ryu Voyager. It was originally a Skill Kyutama that could only transform him into Ryu Violet until the other Kyurangers upgraded it using the energy of their Change Kyutamas.
 11. : Kotaro's personal Ursa Minor-based Change Kyutama which allows him to transform into Koguma Skyblue and pilot the Kuma Voyager. Big Bear created it from the Ooguma Kyutama.
 12. : Tsurugi's personal Phoenix-based Change Kyutama which allows him to transform into Houou Soldier and pilot the Houou Voyager. It also granted him the power of immortality, which he relinquished in order to defeat Don Armage 300 years prior.

Skill
The  Kyutamas either give extra powers to the Kyurangers or bring unusual effects that reflect a real-life basis.
 13. : An Orion-based Skill Kyutama that is used to pilot the Orion Voyager and the Orion Battler. It was originally lost in the past until Lucky met Orion's spirit, who transforms his abandoned club into his Kyutama namesake.
 14. : A Horologium-based Skill Kyutama with the power to travel briefly to the past. Because of energy consumption, it can only be used twice before disappearing.
 15. : A Boötes-based Skill Kyutama that increases the user's speed.
 16. : A Serpens-based Skill Kyutama that creates multiple projections of snakes.
 17. : An Antlia-based Skill Kyutama that generates an energy pump.
 18. : A Hercules-based Skill Kyutama that increases the user's strength.
 19. : A Pyxis-based Skill Kyutama that projects a holographic map for the user to locate the Argos components. However, it takes time to recharge after it is used to find each of them.
 20. : A Telescopium-based Skill Kyutama that projects a homing scope for the user to shoot from long distances.
 21. : A Cancer-based Skill Kyutama that generates an energy pincer on the user's hand.
 22. : An Ursa Major-based Skill Kyutama that allows Koguma Skyblue to become the giant-sized , .
 23. : A Pisces-based Skill Kyutama that materializes a large fish.
 24. : A Scutum-based Skill Kyutama that generates an energy shield.
 25. : A Gemini-based Skill Kyutama that creates duplicates of the user or anyone the user shoots.
 26. : An Aries-based Skill Kyutama that puts anyone the user shoots to sleep.
 27. : A Monoceros-based Skill Kyutama that allows Sasori Orange to become  and perform the  finisher. It was created when Mika Retsu's energy was absorbed into an empty Kyutama following her death.
 28. : An Aquarius-based Skill Kyutama that fires a stream of water.
 29. : A Capricorn-based Skill Kyutama that records a video message for later reproduction.
 30. : A Corona Borealis-based Skill Kyutama that materializes a crown.
 31. : A Centaurus-based Skill Kyutama.
 32. : A Pavo-based Skill Kyutama.
Shishi Red primarily combines with Pega-san to become . By setting this Kyutama in the Kyu Sword, he can perform the  finisher alongside the other Kyurangers.
 34. : A Coma Berenices-based Skill Kyutama that gives people new hairstyles.
 35. : A Sagittarius-based Skill Kyutama that fires countless energy arrows.
 36. : A Perseus-based Skill Kyutama that serves as one of the four components necessary to break Jark Matter's barrier protecting the Crux System.
 37. : A Cetus-based Skill Kyutama that fires a stream of water.
 38. : A Cassiopeia-based Skill Kyutama that materializes a multicolored baseball-sized bomb used for a finisher and serves as one of the four components necessary to break Jark Matter's barrier protecting the Crux System.
 39. : A Lacerta-based Skill Kyutama that enables the user to climb on walls.
 40. : An Andromeda-based Skill Kyutama that materializes chains and serves as one of the four components necessary to break Jark Matter's barrier protecting the Crux System.
 41. : A Microscopium-based Skill Kyutama that grants the user microscopic vision. After Balance modified it, it can also shrink the user to microscopic size.
 42. : A Canes Venatici-based Skill Kyutama that increases the user's sense of smell.
 43. : A Camelopardalis-based Skill Kyutama that elongates the user's neck.
 44. : A Volans-based Skill Kyutama that increases the user's swimming capabilities.
 45. : A Corvus-based Skill Kyutama that traps the target in a world of despair.
 46. : A Norma-based Skill Kyutama that materializes a ruler and a chalk.
 47. : A Sculptor-based Skill Kyutama.
 48. : A Delphinus-based Skill Kyutama.
 49. : A Circinus-based Skill Kyutama that materializes a chalkboard compass.
 50. : An Ara-based Skill Kyutama.
 51. : A Virgo-based Skill Kyutama that increases the user's feminine qualities. If the user is male, it disguises them as a female.
 52. : A Canis Major-based Skill Kyutama that grants the user a dog-based fighting style.
 53. : A Triangulum-based Skill Kyutama.
 54. : A Cepheus-based Skill Kyutama that serves as one of the four components necessary to break Jark Matter's barrier protecting the Crux System.
 55. : A Lyra-based Skill Kyutama that produces soothing music.
 56. : A Cygnus-based Skill Kyutama.
 57. : A Musca-based Skill Kyutama.
 58. : A Columba-based Skill Kyutama that materializes a flight of doves.
 59. : A Pictor-based Skill Kyutama that increases the user's painting capabilities and grants them the ability to predict the intermediate future. Hoshi Minato originally had this before he gave it to Naga.
 60. : An Eridanus-based Skill Kyutama that generates a stream of water that reveals the target's true identity.
 61. : A Tucana-based Skill Kyutama.
 62. : An Auriga-based Skill Kyutama that turns a target into a motorcycle for the user.
 63. : An Equuleus-based Skill Kyutama.
 64. : A Crater-based Skill Kyutama that materializes several drinking glasses.
 65. : A Hydrus-based Skill Kyutama that grants the user a snake-based fighting style.
 66. : A Canis Minor-based Skill Kyutama that causes the user to act like a playful puppy.
 67. : A Hydra-based Skill Kyutama.
 68. : A Lepus-based Skill Kyutama that increases the user's jumping capabilities.
 69. : A Caelum-based Skill Kyutama that generates an energy chisel.
 70. : An Indus-based Skill Kyutama.
 71. : A Mensa-based Skill Kyutama.
 72. : An Apus-based Skill Kyutama that allows the user to move instantly from one place to another.
 73. : A Crux-based Skill Kyutama.
 74. : A Piscis Austrinus-based Skill Kyutama.
 75. : A Triangulum Australe-based Skill Kyutama.
 76. : A Corona Austrina-based Skill Kyutama.
 77. : A Leo Minor-based Skill Kyutama used to summon the Kojishi Voyager.
 78. : A Reticulum-based Skill Kyutama.
 79. : A Sextans-based Skill Kyutama that materializes a sextant.
 80. : An Octans-based Skill Kyutama that materializes an octant.
 81. : A Grus-based Skill Kyutama that grants the user a crane-based fighting style.
 82. : A Vulpecula-based Skill Kyutama that allows the user to turn invisible.
 83. : A Fornax-based Skill Kyutama that materializes a campfire.
 84. : A Sagitta-based Skill Kyutama that materializes baseball clothing and equipment.
 85. : A Lynx-based Skill Kyutama that grants the user a cat-based fighting style.
 86. : A Vela-based Skill Kyutama that serves as one of the three components necessary to complete the Argo Kyutama. The Kyurangers found it on Planet Vela in the Vela System and received it from the planet's natives as a sign of gratitude.
 87. : A Carina-based Skill Kyutama that serves as one of the three components necessary to complete the Argo Kyutama. The Scorpio temporarily stole it from Planet Keel in the Carina System before the Kyurangers eventually got it back.
 88. : A Puppis-based Skill Kyutama that serves as one of the three components necessary to complete the Argo Kyutama. The Kyurangers found it within a Death Worm on Earth. While RyuTeiOh got it out, the Kyutama fell into Ikargen's hands before the Kyurangers defeated him and reclaimed it.
 89. : An Argo Navis-based Skill Kyutama that the Kyurangers obtained by assembling the Ho, Ryukotsu and Tomo Kyutamas. When used, it reveals the location of the Argo spaceship, where Tsurugi was put in a cryogenic sleep.
 111. : A Cerberus-based Skill Kyutama used to summon the Kerberos Voyager. It was created when the Shishi Kyutama Cockpit combined with the Kerberos Voyager.
He can also use this Kyutama to perform the  finisher. This Kyutama was created after Lucky traveled back in time and fought alongside Orion.
 : A purple-colored Skill Kyutama which bears the Jark Matter emblem and obtained by Naga Ray at the time of his brainwashing as Hebitsukai Metal, using it with his Dark Seiza Blaster to perform the  finisher. Naga kept this Kyutama after he was purified from his brainwashing, but later on was converted into a black hole generator to prevent Don Armage's Planedium Bomb from destroying the universe.

Special
These unique Kyutama possess exclusive attributes. Unlike other Kyutamas, they are inscribed with letters instead of numbers.
 KR. : A Kamen Rider-based one-use-only Kyutama that summons Kamen Rider Ex-Aid.
 SP. : A Kyutama whose power is unknown, but is placed in the Kyulette along with the Change Kyutamas. When chosen, it indicates that all of the Kyurangers must be deployed for the mission.
 SP. : A Kyutama that is used to summon all of the Kyurangers' Kyu Voyagers at once.
 SUN/MOON. : A dual-sided Kyutama with two modes that is used by a Kyuranger, primarily Shishi Red, to upgrade their form depending on which half is used in the Seiza Blaster and perform the  finisher.
They can also perform an attack called , which emits a sunlight-like glow that increases Tenbin Gold's power.
They can also perform an attack called , which emits a moonlight-like glow that increases Ookami Blue's power.
 Xmas. : A holiday-based Kyutama that materializes Christmas decorations.

Kyu Voyagers
The  are the Kyurangers' mecha, which are each associated with one of the Kyutamas. They were originally stored within the Orion until it was destroyed and they were transferred to the Battle Orion Ship.
 : Shishi Red's personal Leo-themed Kyu Voyager.
It is normally in a palm-sized form until it is enlarged via the Kojishi Kyutama. Lucky nicknamed it  when he was a child after his father gave it to him, and Garu is able to communicate with it.
 : Sasori Orange's personal Scorpius-themed Kyu Voyager.
 : Ookami Blue's personal Lupus-themed Kyu Voyager.
 : Tenbin Gold's personal Libra Kyu Voyager. It can perform the  attack alongside the Hebitsukai Voyager.
 : Oushi Black's personal Taurus-themed Kyu Voyager.
 : Hebitsukai Silver's personal Ophiuchus Kyu Voyager. It can perform the Happy Splash alongside the Libra Voyager.
 : Chameleon Green's personal Chamaeleon-themed Kyu Voyager.
 : Washi Pink's personal Aquila-themed Kyu Voyager.
 : Kajiki Yellow's personal Dorado-themed Kyu Voyager.
 : Ryu Commander's personal Draco-themed Kyu Voyager. In episode 9, the Ryu Voyager is voiced by Hiroshi Kamiya.
 : Koguma Skyblue's personal Ursa-themed Kyu Voyager. Unlike the other Kyu Voyagers, it is composed of two separate Kyu Voyagers.
 : An Ursa Minor-themed Kyu Voyager that is much smaller than the rest of the Kyu Voyagers.
 : An Ursa Major-themed Kyu Voyager that carries the Koguma Voyager on its back.
 : Houou Soldier's personal phoenix-themed Kyu Voyager.
 : A satellite-like structure used as part of Gigant Houoh.
 : The Houou Voyager's self-propelled launch pad, where the former is stored between missions.
 : A giant battleship that becomes the Kyurangers' base of operations after the Orions destruction, which Orion created to be the ultimate weapon against Jark Matter. It can also transform into a cannon that can be used by the Kyurangers' giant robots to perform the  finisher.
 : Shishi Red Orion's personal Kyu Voyager, which is part of the Battle Orion Ship.
 : A Cerberus-themed Kyu Voyager that appears exclusively in the film Uchu Sentai Kyuranger the Movie: Geth Indaver Strikes Back. Geth Indaver manages to summon Kerberos before the Kyurangers pacify it and turn it into a Voyager Machine to destroy his Geth Star. Following the battle, the Kerberos Stone fragments returned to their respective planets.

Kyutama Combinations
The Kyu Voyagers can be assembled into larger mecha via .

: The Kyurangers' first giant robot composed of the Shishi Voyager and four other Kyu Voyagers. As each Kyu Voyager possesses a specific ability, the myriad number of possible combinations give KyurenOh flexibility in combat along with a unique variation of its finisher.
 KyurenOh (01-03-05-07-09): The primary arrangement composed of the Shishi, Ookami, Oushi, Chameleon, and Kajiki Voyagers.
 KyurenOh (01-02-04-06-08): The secondary arrangement composed of the Shishi, Sasori, Tenbin, Hebitsukai, and Washi Voyagers. This arrangement appears exclusively in the crossover film Kamen Rider × Super Sentai: Ultra Super Hero Taisen.
 KyurenOh (01-03-04-05-06): An alternate arrangement composed of the Shishi, Ookami, Tenbin, Oushi, and Hebitsukai Voyagers.
 KyurenOh (01-03-06-07-09): An alternate arrangement composed of the Shishi, Ookami, Hebitsukai, Chameleon, and Kajiki Voyagers.
 KyurenOh (01-03-05-08-09): An alternate arrangement composed of the Shishi, Ookami, Oushi, Washi, and Kajiki Voyagers. Its finisher is the KyurenOh: Meteor Break.
 KyurenOh (01-04-06-08-09): An alternate arrangement composed of the Shishi, Tenbin, Hebitsukai, Washi, and Kajiki Voyagers.
 KyurenOh (01-02-03-05-07): An alternate arrangement composed of the Shishi, Sasori, Ookami, Oushi, and Chameleon Voyagers.
 KyurenOh (01-03-04-07-09): An alternate arrangement composed of the Shishi, Ookami, Tenbin, Chameleon, and Kajiki Voyagers.
 KyurenOh (01-02-04-06-07): An alternate arrangement composed of the Shishi, Sasori, Tenbin, Hebitsukai, and Chameleon Voyagers.
 KyurenOh (01-02-03-07-08): An alternate arrangement composed of the Shishi, Sasori, Ookami, Chameleon, and Washi Voyagers. Its finisher is the KyurenOh: Meteor Break.
 KyurenOh (01-02-07-08-09): An alternate arrangement composed of the Shishi, Sasori, Chameleon, Washi, and Kajiki Voyagers. Its finisher is the  alongside the Ryu Voyager.
 KyurenOh (01-02-03-05-11): An alternate arrangement composed of the Shishi, Sasori, Ookami, Oushi, and Kuma Voyagers.
 KyurenOh (01-06-07-08-09): An alternate arrangement composed of the Shishi, Hebitsukai, Chameleon, Washi, and Kajiki Voyagers. Its finisher is the KyurenOh: Meteor Break.
 KyurenOh (01-04-06-07-09): An alternate arrangement composed of the Shishi, Tenbin, Hebitsukai, Chameleon, and Kajiki Voyagers. Its finisher is the KyurenOh: Meteor Break.
 KyurenOh (01-03-07-08-09): An alternate arrangement composed of the Shishi, Ookami, Chameleon, Washi, and Kajiki Voyagers. Its finisher is the KyurenOh: Meteor Break.
 KyurenOh (01-03-06-07-08-09): A special arrangement composed of the Shishi, Ookami, Hebitsukai, Chameleon, Washi, and Kajiki Voyagers.
 KyurenOh (01-02-07-09-11): An alternate arrangement composed of the Shishi, Sasori, Chameleon, Kajiki, and Kuma Voyagers. Its finisher is the Triple Meteor Break alongside RyuTeiOh and Gigant Houoh.
 KyurenOh (01-03-03-07-07): A special arrangement composed of the Shishi Voyager, a duplicated Ookami Voyager, and a duplicated Chameleon Voyager.
 KyurenOh (01-02-05-08-09): An alternate arrangement composed of the Shishi, Sasori, Oushi, Washi, and Kajiki Voyagers. Its finisher is the KyurenOh: Meteor Break.
 KyurenOh (01-02-05-07-09): An alternate arrangement composed of the Shishi, Sasori, Oushi, Chameleon, and Kajiki Voyagers.
 KyurenOh (01-06-07-09-11): An alternate arrangement composed of the Shishi, Hebitsukai, Chameleon, Kajiki, and Kuma Voyagers. Its finisher is the KyurenOh: Meteor Break.
 KyurenOh (04-06-09-11-77): An alternate arrangement composed of the Shishi, Tenbin, Hebitsukai, Kajiki, and Kuma Voyagers. Unlike other arrangements, the Kojishi Kyutama Cockpit replaces the Shishi Kyutama Cockpit in this combination.
 KyurenOh (01-04-05-07-09): An alternate arrangement composed of the Shishi, Tenbin, Oushi, Chameleon, and Kajiki Voyagers. Its finisher is the Triple Meteor Break alongside RyuTeiOh and Gigant Houoh.
 KyurenOh (01-02-04-05-06): An alternate arrangement composed of the Shishi, Sasori, Tenbin, Oushi, and Hebitsukai Voyagers.
: An enhanced version of KyurenOh composed of the Super Shishi Voyager, Kajiki Voyager and three other Kyu Voyagers.
 Super KyurenOh (03-05-07-09-77): The default arrangement composed of the Ookami, Oushi, Chameleon, Kajiki, and Super Shishi Voyagers.
 Super KyurenOh (03-04-06-09-77): An alternate arrangement composed of the Ookami, Tenbin, Hebitsukai, Kajiki, and Super Shishi Voyagers.
 Super KyurenOh (04-06-09-11-77): An alternate arrangement composed of the Tenbin, Hebitsukai, Kajiki, Kuma, and Super Shishi Voyagers. Its finisher is the Super KyurenOh: Final Break.
 Super KyurenOh (02-05-09-11-77): An alternate arrangement composed of the Sasori, Oushi, Kajiki, Kuma, and Super Shishi Voyagers. Its finisher is the Super KyurenOh: Final Break.
 Super KyurenOh (02-05-07-09-77): An alternate arrangement composed of the Sasori, Oushi, Chameleon, Kajiki, and Super Shishi Voyagers. Its finisher is the Super KyurenOh: Final Break.
 Super KyurenOh (02-06-07-09-77): An alternate arrangement composed of the Sasori, Hebitsukai, Chameleon, Kajiki, and Super Shishi Voyagers.
 Super KyurenOh (02-07-09-11-77): An alternate arrangement composed of the Sasori, Chameleon, Kajiki, Kuma, and Super Shishi Voyagers.
 Super KyurenOh (04-05-07-09-77): An alternate arrangement composed of the Tenbin, Oushi, Chameleon, Kajiki, and Super Shishi Voyagers. Its finisher is the Super KyurenOh: Final Break.
: The Kyurangers' second giant robot composed of the Ryu Voyager and two other Kyu Voyagers.
 RyuTeiOh (02-10-11): The default arrangement composed of the Sasori, Ryu, and Kuma Voyagers.
 RyuTeiOh (07-09-10): An alternate arrangement composed of the Chameleon, Kajiki, and Ryu Voyagers. Its finisher is the RyuTeiOh: Meteor Break.
 RyuTeiOh (04-06-10): An alternate arrangement composed of the Tenbin, Hebitsukai, and Ryu Voyagers. Its finisher is the RyuTeiOh: Meteor Break.
 RyuTeiOh (03-04-10): An alternate arrangement composed of the Ookami, Tenbin, and Ryu Voyagers. Its finisher is the RyuTeiOh: Meteor Break.
 RyuTeiOh (03-07-10): An alternate arrangement composed of the Ookami, Chameleon, and Ryu Voyagers.
 RyuTeiOh (06-10-11): An alternate arrangement composed of the Hebitsukai, Ryu, and Kuma Voyagers. Its finisher is the RyuTeiOh: Meteor Break.
 RyuTeiOh (03-05-10): An alternate arrangement composed of the Ookami, Oushi, and Ryu Voyagers.
 RyuTeiOh (08-09-10): An alternate arrangement composed of the Washi, Kajiki, and Ryu Voyagers. Its finisher is the RyuTeiOh: Meteor Break.
 RyuTeiOh (03-06-10): An alternate arrangement composed of the Ookami, Hebitsukai, and Ryu Voyagers.
 RyuTeiOh (07-08-10): An alternate arrangement composed of the Chameleon, Washi, and Ryu Voyagers.
 RyuTeiOh (03-06-07-08-10): A special arrangement composed of the Ryu Voyager, the Ookami, Hebitsukai, Chameleon, and Washi Kyutamas, and Houou Voyager's rockets.
 RyuTeiOh (03-08-10): An alternate arrangement composed of the Ookami, Washi, and Ryu Voyagers. Its finisher is the RyuTeiOh: Meteor Break.
: The Kyurangers' first super giant robot composed of the Shishi Voyager, Ryu Voyager, and six other Kyu Voyagers.
 RyuTei KyurenOh (01-02-03-05-07-09-10-11): The default arrangement composed of the Shishi, Sasori, Ookami, Oushi, Chameleon, Kajiki, Ryu, and Kuma Voyagers.
 RyuTei KyurenOh (01-02-04-05-07-09-10-11): An alternate arrangement composed of the Shishi, Sasori, Tenbin, Oushi, Chameleon, Kajiki, Ryu, and Kuma Voyagers.
: Houou Soldier's personal giant robot composed of the Houou Voyager and Houou Station. It is armed with the  swords, which allow it to perform the  finisher. It can also perform the  finisher.
: A special giant robot composed of the Kerberos, Oushi, Hebitsukai, Chameleon, and Kajiki Voyagers with the ability to temporarily enlarge itself with the power of the Hikari Kyutama's Tsuki Mode. This combination appears exclusively in the film Uchu Sentai Kyuranger the Movie: Geth Indaver Strikes Back.
In the final episode, Kyutamajin uses a new finisher called .
 is the Kyurangers' third super giant robot composed of the Battle Orion Ship and Orion Voyager. Although it is usually piloted by Shishi Red Orion, it can operate independently to support the Kyurangers in battle.

Recurring characters

Jark Matter
The  is an organization of aliens that have conquered an untold number of planets, including  and the 88 constellations that surround it, with the goal of gathering , the planets' core energy, for a  so they can destroy the entire universe.

Don Armage
Revealing himself when Tsurugi united the universe 300 years prior, Armage established Jark Matter to destroy everything Tsurugi had built to thrive on the resulting misery, increase his power, and become a god. He was seemingly killed while battling Tsurugi, but Armage survived by possessing Tsurugi's ally Cuervo and retaliates by conquering Earth along with erasing records of Tsurugi and his comrades' achievements.

After the Kyurangers weakened his forces and destroyed his Planedium Bomb, Don Armage confronted them on Earth, where Cuervo expelled him and forced him to take Tsurugi as his new host, in an attempt to harness  energy until the Kyurangers rescue their ally. Taking on his natural form, he converts every living being in the universe besides himself and the Kyurangers into Planedium energy and absorbs them to assume a new form, but the Kyurangers are able to release them as well, defeating him in the process. In a last-ditch attempt at cheating death, Don Armage implanted a fragment of himself inside Lucky's body in the hopes of eventually resurrecting himself, but this plan backfires and the fragment is forced back into his original body before the Kyurangers permanently finish him off.

Don Armage is capable of possessing others and using their abilities, producing clones, transmit his energy through his holograms, and impart fragments of his essence into others to transform them into monsters.

Cuervo
Three centuries prior, he helped his fellow prisoners escape and was recruited by Tsurugi to become his partner and a member of the original Rebellion before joining him in recruiting 86 other warriors to overthrow Jark Matter. During what appeared to be the final battle against Don Armage, Cuervo seemingly sacrificed himself to save Tsurugi. In reality, he sold his soul to the tyrant in exchange for his life, became his host, and was reborn as Don Armage's thrall, the Hindu cosmology-themed ; loyally serving him from then on.

While Jark Matter was commencing their final experiments on Dark Planedium on Planet Southern Cross, Cuervo revealed himself to Tsurugi when he and the Kyurangers came to destroy the Planedium Bomb. During the Kyurangers' final battle against Don Armage on Earth, Cuervo revealed he had subverted Armage's will, but willingly helped him in his plans so he could see the destroyed universe recreated as a utopia. However, Don Armage was extracted from his body and he was killed by Tsurugi.

As one of the 88 legendary saviors, Cuervo wields a pair of sai and wears a heliocentrism-themed chest armor. As Don Cuervo, he wields the twin  swords.

As Don Cuervo, his voice is blended together with Atsuki Tani, Don Armage's voice actor.

Vice Shoguns
The  are the second-highest-ranking members of Jark Matter, serving directly under the Shogun and answering only to him. Instead of a Kyodainro, each of them carry a golden dragon pad on the right shoulder that allows them to enlarge and shrink back to normal size. They were among the organization's original members three centuries prior, having battled the original Rebellion members, and were later converted into cyborgs by Doctor Anton to prolong their lives. Following the Fuku Shoguns' defeat, Doctor Anton gathers their remains and combines them to create the three-headed Bermuda Triangle-themed , who wields all of original Fuku Shoguns' weapons and can perform the  attack. An enlarged Akyachuga is sent to defend Planet Southern Cross's core against the Kyurangers before being destroyed by KyurenOh (01-02-03-05-11), RyuTeiOh (07-09-10), and Gigant Houoh using the Battle Orion Ship in its cannon mode.

Tetchu
Initially a hand-to-hand fighter in the past, his cyborg modifications armed him with the  flail on his left arm. He is eventually defeated by the Kyurangers on Planet Toki and destroyed by Kyutamajin.

Akyanba
She is armed with the  microphone, an upgraded version of the  she previously wielded in the past. Following Tetchu's death, Akyanba is sent to eliminate the Kyurangers by unlocking Naga's emotions, with the aid of Micro Tsuyoindaver. However, Naga is eventually freed from her control and leads the Kyurangers in destroying Akyanba.

Kukuruga
He oversaw the conquest of Planet Kaien and seemingly killed King Aslan while his son Lucky was spirited away and hidden in the Leo Minor System. In reality, he ensured Aslan's downfall and contributed to turning him into one of Don Armage's thralls. Originally armed with the  saber when Jark Matter was founded, Kukulga has his left arm outfitted with  cannon by the present. While supporting Akyanba following Tetchu's death, Kukulga took an interest in Lucky as a result of the youth traveling back in time and defeating his past self. Kukulga later fights Shishi Red Orion on Planet Kaien, where his scheme is exposed. Upon being defeated by Shishi Red Orion and the Kyurangers, Kukulga enlarges and is destroyed by Super KyurenOh (04-06-09-11-77) and Orion Battler.

Aides
After being defeated by Shishi Red and Houou Soldier, Gyabura is enlarged and killed by Kyutamajin.
After being defeated by Shishi Red Orion, Sasori Orange, Ookami Blue, Hebitsukai Silver, Chameleon Green, Washi Pink, and Houou Soldier, Dogyun is enlarged and creates a  before he is killed by Kyutamajin.

Doctor Anton
 is a scientist who once worked for Jark Matter for several centuries, gradually turning himself into a cyborg to prolong his life. This resulted in Anton being able to act independently of his evil-half, allowing him to leave Jark Matter to prevent the newly built Champ from being used for evil and teach his creation to value all forms of life. The good Anton is later murdered by Scorpio while his evil counterpart works for Jark Matter unopposed and transforms a majority of its high-ranking members into cyborgs.

The evil Anton eventually reveals himself to the Kyurangers during their quest to access the Crux System. With Mecha Mardakko's help, he kidnaps Champ and restores his prime directive as a war machine before Stinger destroyed the berserker chip, freeing his ally from the Anton Brain's control. Following the destruction of Planet Southern Cross, the evil Anton flees and installs himself into a Zero unit to regain full mobility as the tesla coil-themed . However, he is defeated by Shishi Red, Sasori Orange, Tenbin Gold, Oushi Black, Hebitsukai Silver, and Koguma Skyblue. Upon being enlarged, he is destroyed by KyurenOh (01-02-04-05-06) and Orion Battler.

Zero
The first Zero unit is created by Akyanba and Kukuruga using blueprints Doctor Anton left behind in a scheme to destroy the Kyurangers. While originally identical to Champ, the android's casing is destroyed by the real Champ to reveal its true appearance. Though it is defeated by the Kyurangers, the Zero unit is enlarged before being destroyed by KyurenOh (01-02-03-05-11), RyuTeiOh (07-09-10), and Gigant Houoh using the Battle Orion Ship in its cannon mode. Following this, Jark Matter mass-produced Zero and employed them on several occasions against the Kyurangers.

Karos
The  are elite members responsible for controlling conquered star systems.

Eriedrone
After being ordered by Don Armage to eliminate the Kyurangers, he pursued them across the galaxy until they reached Earth, where he is killed in his Big Morimers after it is destroyed by KyurenOh (01-02-03-05-07).

Scorpio
 is Stinger's older brother who betrayed him and his people to join Jark Matter, becoming Don Armage's top assassin. Because of his success, his position is only known to Don Armage and he is eventually promoted to Karo of the Scorpius System. He was sent to Earth after the Kyurangers became a threat to Jark Matter's campaign when they defeated Eriedrone and Ikargen. Upon reuniting with Stinger, Scorpio tricks him into believing he joined Jark Matter to kill Don Armage and save the universe. However, he later revealed his true goal was to usurp the tyrant and assume control of Jark Matter for himself. After being defeated by Stinger, Scorpio chooses to save his brother from their people's Antares technique and sacrifice himself to protect the Kyurangers from Don Armage's attack.

In battle, Scorpio's primary ability is to transform the victims of his tail stinger's venom into his zombie-like slaves. While he was originally humanoid like Stinger and their people, Don Armage mutated him into a sea scorpion/crop circle-themed monstrous being with the ability to wrap his tail around his leg and perform a powerful kick attack.

Minor Karos
After being defeated by Shishi Red, Tenbin Gold, Hebitsukai Silver, Chameleon Green, Kajiki Yellow, and Houou Soldier, Magera is enlarged before he is killed by Orion Battler.
After being defeated by Shishi Red Orion, Sasori Orange, Ookami Blue, Oushi Black, Chameleon Green, and Kajiki Yellow, Unjet is enlarged before he is killed by Super KyurenOh (03-05-07-09-77).
He used his sand doll creation ability to assume the identity of King Aslan and rule Planet Kaien with an iron fist until the Kyurangers discover his ruse. He is later killed in his Big Morimers after it is destroyed by Gigant Houoh.
After being defeated by Ookami Blue, Hebitsukai Silver, Chameleon Green, Washi Pink, Ryu Commander, and Houou Soldier, Desugon is enlarged before he is killed by RyuTeiOh (03-06-07-08-10).
After being defeated by Shishi Red Orion, Gloven is enlarged before he is killed by Kyutamajin and Orion Battler.
He had previously ruled his home world before willingly swearing allegiance to Don Armage to obtain more power, at the cost of his people. He serves as the first of Armage's defenders after the Kyurangers bypass the barrier protecting the Crux System and attack Planet Southern Cross, though he is killed by Shishi Red Orion.

Other Karos
He was previously a Daikaan on Earth before he manipulated an Earth town he terrorized into ostracizing the human-alien hybrid Mika Retsu and exploiting her revenge for Don Armage's enjoyment. In the present, he makes himself known to the Kyurangers while they were liberating Planet 3B before he is killed by Sasori Orange Ikkakuju Arm.

Assassins
The assassins are members of Jark Matter responsible for eliminating rebels and rank between Karo and Daikaan.

Ikargen
Throughout his career as a Jark Matter assassin, he has destroyed over one thousand planets alongside Mardakko and brought the Rebellion to the brink of destruction after killing their leader, Big Bear. Following Eriedrone's death, he and Mardakko are sent to eliminate the Kyurangers. Ikargen was able to dodge all of their attacks until Lucky used the Futago Kyutama's power to counteract the assassin's biology before he was defeated by the Kyurangers. Ikargen enlarged himself and attempted to produce torrential acid rain, but was destroyed by RyuTei KyurenOh (01-02-03-05-07-09-10-11).

Mardakko
Initially a rude and hot-blooded individual, Mardakko is deployed to Earth with her partner Ikargen to eliminate the Kyurangers following Eriedrone's demise, but are killed themselves. Developing secretary mannerisms, then a sensual and flirty persona after a second encounter with the Kyurangers, Don Armage orders her to spy on Scorpio under the guise of becoming his second-in-command. Though Mardakko is killed while in the Space Squad's universe while attempting to steal the Rashinban Kyutama, Scorpio uses a fragment he kept on his person to revive her as an over-dramatic individual. She activates all of the Morimers on Earth to siphon its Planedium before they and Scorpio's Big Morimers are destroyed by Houou Soldier, who kills her in the subsequent duel. Tetchu revives her once more on Planet Toki, though she develops a groupie-like personality and spends more time idolizing the Kyurangers instead of fighting them before they kill her once again.

Following her sixth revival, Mardakko returns to her original personality, became the Karo of the Perseus System, and allows herself to be converted into the cyborg  to become more powerful, while sacrificing her regenerative abilities. While she is defeated by 10 of the Kyurangers during the battle on Planet Southern Cross, Mecha Mardakko is enlarged and summons a Death Worm to aid her before she is destroyed along with the creature by Kyutamajin and the Battle Orion Ship.

Foot soldiers
: Masked grey alien-themed  battle pseudo-lifeform combatants who are armed with the  sabers and pilot fighter crafts called .
: Flatwoods monster-themed enhanced battle pseudo-lifeform combatants who lead the Indavers, are armed with the  clubs that double as a gun, and have the ability to enlarge themselves. The high-ranking members have a  inro as proof of authority, which can also be used to enlarge themselves.

Daikaans
The  are commanders who are sent to conquer and control planets. While most planets are occupied by one Daikaan, Earth is controlled by multiple Daikaans since it is rich in Planedium. Most Daikaans are aliens that hailed from various points of origin in the universe, though some are Tsuyoindavers who were promoted and received modifications in the Jark Matter Laboratory.

Though he is defeated by Shishi Red, Tenbin Gold, and Hebitsukai Silver, Gamettsui is enlarged before being destroyed by KyurenOh (01-03-04-05-06).
He is destroyed by Sasori Orange for intervening in his battle with Shishi Red.
Though he is defeated by Shishi Red, Yumepakkun is enlarged before being destroyed by KyurenOh (01-04-06-08-09).
He is killed when his Morimers Robo is destroyed by KyurenOh (01-03-04-07-09).
Though he is defeated by Shishi Red, Sasori Orange, Tenbin Gold, Hebitsukai Silver, and Chameleon Green, Tome is enlarged before being destroyed along with his Morimers by the Tenbin and Hebitsukai Voyagers.
He enlarges himself, but is destroyed by the Shishi and Kajiki Voyagers alongside his Morimers.
He is killed in his Morimers Robo when it is destroyed by KyurenOh (01-02-03-07-08). Megatsuyoindaver is voiced by Yasunao Sakai.
He is destroyed by Shishi Red, Chameleon Green, and Kajiki Yellow.
Though he is defeated by Shishi Red, Ookami Blue, and Washi Pink, Metchatsuyoindaver is enlarged before being destroyed by the Ryu Voyager.
 : One of Earth's Daikaans and a promoted Tsuyoindaver who wears the  helmet and is armed with a Bazookon. Though he is defeated by Sasori Orange, Chameleon Green, and Kajiki Yellow, Mutchatsuyoindaver is enlarged before being destroyed by the Ryu Voyager.
He is destroyed by Shishi Red and Koguma Skyblue.
Though he is defeated by Shishi Red, Sasori Orange, Oushi Black, Ryu Commander, and Koguma Skyblue, Mondomuyoindaver is destroyed along with his Morimers Robo by RyuTei KyurenOh (01-02-03-05-07-09-10-11).
He is destroyed by Shishi Red, Ookami Blue, and Kajiki Yellow.
Though he is defeated by Shishi Red, Hebitsukai Silver, Chameleon Green, Washi Pink, and Kajiki Yellow, Goneshi is enlarged before being destroyed along with his Morimers by KyurenOh (01-06-07-08-09).
Though he is defeated by Shishi Red Moon, Shaidos is enlarged before being destroyed by RyuTeiOh (03-04-10).
Though he is defeated by Tenbin Gold, Hebitsukai Silver, Chameleon Green, and Kajiki Yellow, Omega is enlarged before being destroyed along with his Morimers by KyurenOh (01-04-06-07-09).
 : One Earth's Daikaans and the president of Jark Matter University's Earth branch. Though he is defeated by Washi Pink, Kajiki Yellow, and Houou Soldier, Manavil is enlarged before being destroyed by Gigant Houoh.
 : One of Earth's Daikaans and a promoted Tsuyoindaver who wears the  protector, is armed with a Bazookon, and is accompanied by an Indaver operating the  television camera. Though he is defeated by Shishi Red, Ookami Blue, Chameleon Green, Washi Pink, and Kajiki Yellow, Media Tsuyoindaver is enlarged before being destroyed by KyurenOh (01-03-07-08-09) and RyuTeiOh (06-10-11).
Though he is defeated by Shishi Red, Micro Tsuyoindaver is enlarged to human size before being destroyed by Tenbin Gold and Hebitsukai Silver. Before he died, he created a giant replica of Hebitsukai Metal, but it is destroyed by Kyutamajin.

Other Daikaans
Though he is defeated by Shishi Red, Ookami Blue, Hebitsukai Silver, Chameleon Green, and Kajiki Yellow, Clocku is enlarged before being destroyed by KyurenOh (01-03-06-07-09).
Kouchou Indaver is killed when his Morimers Robo is destroyed by KyurenOh (01-06-07-09-11). This Daikaan appears exclusively in the web-exclusive series From Episode of Stinger: Uchu Sentai Kyuranger: High School Wars and the film Uchu Sentai Kyuranger: Episode of Stinger. Kouchou Indaver is voiced by 
 : Kouchou Indaver's wife who serves as the school's vice-principal. She is defeated by the Kyurangers. Kyoutou Indaver appears exclusively in High School Wars.
 : Kouchou Indaver's son who serves as the school's student council president. He is defeated by the Kyurangers. Seitokaichou Indaver appears exclusively in High School Wars. Seitokaichou Indaver is voiced by Yousuke Itou.
He is destroyed by Kotaro. This Daikaan appears exclusively in the web-exclusive series From Episode of Stinger: Uchu Sentai Kyuranger: High School Wars.
 : One of Earth's Daikaans and a human-alien hybrid with the genetic code of a Monoceros System alien who wields the  alicorn. She was initially a Jark Matter recruit from Earth under the Karo Zandabarudo who wanted the power to exact revenge on her fellow townsfolk for ostracizing her due to her heritage. After Don Armage promoted her to Daikaan, he infused her with his essence, granting her the ability to transform into a human combustion-themed partial monster. Stinger and Champ attempt to save her, but she is murdered by Zandabarudo, who reveals he manipulated her life for his own ambitions. Using the last of her life, she gave Stinger the Ikkakuju Kyutama so he could defeat Zandabarudo.
He is destroyed by Shishi Red, Hebitsukai Silver, Washi Pink, Kajiki Yellow, and Ryu Commander. This Daikaan appears exclusively in the CD audio drama Uchu Sentai Kyuranger: Make Him Cry! The Tamakyu Troupe Hot Match!.

Hoshi Minato
 is an alien pop star known as the No.1 artist in the universe. In the past, he was originally a lonely low-level street performer, until an encounter with his friend Hammie set them both on the path to finding their dreams to live on. After the Kyurangers discover and free Minato from one of Don Armage's copies, he rallies his fans into rebelling against Jark Matter.

Orion
: A warrior from  who wields a club in combat, one of the legendary 88 saviors who fought alongside Tsurugi in the past against Jark Matter, and the namesake of the Kyurangers' ship. After Don Armage's apparent defeat, he placed Tsurugi into a cryogenic slumber within the Argo and entrusted Eris with the Ryukotsu Kyutama. He would later meet and join forces with the Kyurangers after half of them traveled back in time to learn more about Don Armage and help his distant descendant Lucky unlock the Saiko Kyutama. After Orion died in battle against Don Armage, Shou Ronpo and Champ chose to stay behind in the past to take his place in ensuring the Kyurangers assemble in the present.

Aslan
Lucky's father, was originally the king of Planet Kaien in the Leo System prior to Jark Matter's invasion. While the Kyurangers believed he was killed by Kukuruga and a facsimile ruled over Kaien in his place, Aslan was in reality possessed by Don Armage to become his thrall . He faced the Kyurangers Planet Southern Cross in the Crux System as one of Armage's last lines of defense, but after they freed him, Aslan helps the Kyurangers escape before sacrificing himself to use the Black Hole Kyutama to prevent Jark Matter's Planedium Bomb from destroying the universe.

Guest characters
: A revived squid monster from the Shocker terrorist organization who attracts the attention of Shishi Red and Sasori Orange after they mistake him for Ikargen. After Shishi Red summons Kamen Rider Ex-Aid, they join forces to destroy Space Ikadevil.
: A master gamer and surgical intern who battles the Bugsters to protect his patients. Using the power of the Ex-Aid Kyutama, Lucky summons Ex-Aid to help him defeat Space Ikadevil. The Kyurangers would later join forces with Ex-Aid again to defeat Shocker during the events of the crossover film Kamen Rider × Super Sentai: Ultra Super Hero Taisen.
: An ursine alien and the Rebellion's original supreme commander and Shou's superior. Big Bear sacrificed himself to save Shou from Jark Matter assassins Ikargen and Mardakko, but was unable to ascend to the afterlife after seeing Shou's foolishness in commanding the Rebellion and worrying for his comrade. After seeing Shou's effectiveness as a leader and Kotaro's bravery in battle, Big Bear entrusts the latter with the Koguma Kyutama and returns to inhabit it so he can fight alongside him.
: Subterranean alien creatures that are widely distributed on desert planets, possess , and the ability to change their size at will. The Kyurangers encounter several during their battles against Jark Matter, with the latter faction having used them on several occasions.
The : A group of space-based heroes from another universe. In episode 18, Shishi Red and Hebitsukai Silver encounter them while pursuing Mardakko to reclaim the Rashinban Kyutama. The Kyurangers would encounter the Space Squad again amidst their battle with Demost during the events of the crossover film Uchu Sentai Kyuranger vs. Space Squad.
: The forest spirit of Planet Keel in the Carina System who has the ability to manipulate plants and an ally of the original Kyurangers. Centuries prior, she was charged by Orion with protecting the Ryukotsu Kyutama and by the time traveling Shou with the Battle Orion Ships location. Despite her role, she has a ditzy personality and a tendency to fall in love with whoever impresses her.
: A woman from the Ophiuchus System who came to Earth following Naga Ray's brainwashing. While she initially intends to punish him for obtaining emotions, as it is considered a crime on their home world, she decides to have faith in Naga after his purification and departs peacefully.

Spin-off exclusive characters
Independent units: Jark Matter members who appear exclusively in the film Uchu Sentai Kyuranger the Movie: Geth Indaver Strikes Back.
He was originally a Rebellion member named  and Shou Ronpo's colleague who researched the Kerberos' legend until Shou was forced to banish him from the Rebellion upon learning of Hoi's malicious intent. Following this, Hoi joined Jark Matter, had his body cybernetically modified, and gained command of the planet-sized superweapon . Geth Indaver's desire for revenge and Kerberos' power fueled his intent to smash the Geth Star into Earth. Though he manages to revive Kerberos before it is turned into the Kerberos Voyager, Geth Indaver is killed by Ryu Commander while the Geth Star is destroyed by Kerberios.
: A yeti-themed member of the Independent Units who excels in wrestling and is armed with the  kusari-fundo. After being defeated by Tenbin Gold, Hebitsukai Silver, Washi Pink, and Koguma Skyblue, Omo Indaver is enlarged before he is killed by Gigant Houoh.
: A skyfish-themed member of the Independent Units who is armed with the  sword that doubles as a gun and possesses a motorcycle. He is killed by Oushi Black, Chameleon Green, and Kajiki Yellow.
: A space ninja who seeks to take over the universe using the Neo Kyutamas and appears exclusively in the crossover film Uchu Sentai Kyuranger vs. Space Squad. After kidnapping Hammie's mentor Tsurukiku to force her into helping him get the Kyutamas, Demost revives Mere, Juzo Fuwa, Basco Ta Jolokia, and Escape to assist him as well before he is defeated by the Kyurangers, Gavan Type-G, and Space Sheriff Shaider.
: A Jark Matter remnant and Don Armage's body double who seeks the power of Jark Matter's lost treasure, to surpass Armage as the greatest evil in the universe, wields the twin  swords in combat, and appears exclusively in the crossover special Lupinranger VS Patranger VS Kyuranger. In pursuit of his goal, he invades the Lupinrangers and Patrangers' universe and joins forces with Gangler member Rirus Lipig to find Hoshi Minato. After the Kyurangers pursue him and join forces with the Lupinrangers and Patrangers to stop him, Don Arkage enlarges, but is killed by Good Cool Kaiser VSX. Don Arkage is voiced by Atsuki Tani.

References

Lists of children's television characters
Lists of superheroes
Super Sentai characters